Bunaeopsis zaddachi, or Zaddachi's emperor moth, is a moth of the family Saturniidae. The species was first described by Hermann Dewitz in 1879. It is known from Africa, including Tanzania.

References

Saturniinae
Moths described in 1879